The Border Conference, officially known as the Border Intercollegiate Athletic Association, was an NCAA-affiliated college athletic conference founded in 1931 that disbanded following the 1961–62 season.  Centered in the southwestern United States, the conference included nine member institutions located in the states of Arizona, New Mexico, and Texas.

History

Chronological timeline
 1931 - The Border Conference (also known as the Border Intercollegiate Athletic Association) was founded. Charter members included the University of Arizona, Arizona State Teachers College at Flagstaff (now Northern Arizona University), Arizona State Teachers College at Tempe (now Arizona State University), the University of New Mexico and New Mexico College of Agriculture and Mechanical Arts (now New Mexico State University), effective beginning the 1931-32 academic year.
 1932 - Texas Technological College (now Texas Tech University) joined the Border, effective the 1932-33 academic year.
 1935 - The College of Mines and Metallurgy of the University of Texas (now the University of Texas at El Paso) joined the Border, effective the 1935-36 academic year.
 1941 - Hardin–Simmons University and West Texas State Teachers College (now West Texas A&M University) joined the Border, effective the 1941-42 academic year.
 1952 - New Mexico left the Border to join the Skyline Conference (a.k.a. the Mountain States Conference), effective after the 1951-52 academic year.
 1953 - Northern Arizona left the Border to join the New Mexico Conference, effective after the 1952-53 academic year.
 1957 - Texas Tech left the Border to join the Southwest Conference, effective after the 1956-57 academic year.
 1962 - The Border ceased operations as an athletic conference, effective after the 1962-63 academic year; as many schools left to find new conference homes, effective beginning the 1963-64 academic year: Arizona and Arizona State to the Western Athletic Conference (WAC); while Hardin–Simmons, New Mexico State, UTEP and West Texas A&M began to compete as Independents.

Member schools

Final members

Notes

Former members

Notes

Membership timeline

Football champions

Texas Tech holds the most conference championships at seven. Arizona State won six conference championships followed by Arizona (three), Hardin–Simmons (two) and both West Texas State and the Texas State School of Mines hold one each. From 1932 to 1934 and 1943 to 1945 no champion was named. There were only two seasons where the title was split and two co-champions were named; 1938, New Mexico and New Mexico A&M and in 1942 Hardin–Simmons and Texas Tech. The winner of the conference title generally received an invitation to serve as the host team for the Sun Bowl in El Paso, Texas.

Current conference affiliations of former members

The nine former football-playing members of the Border Intercollegiate Athletic Association are currently affiliated with the following nine conferences (all NCAA Division I FBS unless indicated):

Arizona State University and University of Arizona – Pac-12 Conference
Hardin–Simmons University – American Southwest Conference (Division III) 
University of New Mexico – Mountain West Conference
New Mexico State University – Independent (football), Western Athletic Conference (all other sports). Moving fully to Conference USA in 2023.
Northern Arizona University – Big Sky Conference (Division I FCS)
University of Texas at El Paso (UTEP) – Conference USA
Texas Tech University – Big 12 Conference
West Texas A&M University – Lone Star Conference (Division II)

See also
List of defunct college football conferences

References